The 2008 Australian Superkart Championship covers national level Superkart racing in Australia during 2008.

Featured events

Australian Superkart Championship
The 2008 Australian Superkart Championship will be the 20th running of the national championships for Superkarts.  It will begin on 13 July 2008 at Eastern Creek Raceway (using what is currently known as the Gardner Grand Prix Circuit) and end on 2 November at Mallala Motor Sport Park after eight races.

It will be contested for three engine based classes, 250 cc International (twin cylinder engines), 250 cc National (single-cylinder engines) and 125 cc.

Non-Gearbox Superkart Championship
The Australian championship for non-gearbox Superkarts will be held at Phillip Island Grand Prix Circuit on 10 August and will be consisted of the Rotax Max family of classes; two weight based classes Light and Heavy and Junior Max for competitors under the age of 17.

V8 Supercar
Superkarts will compete as a support category for V8 Supercars for the first time at the series second round, to be held at Eastern Creek on 9 March.

Teams and drivers

Gearbox
The following drivers competed in the 2008 Australian Superkart Championship. The series consisted of two rounds, with four races at each meeting.

Non-gearbox
The following drivers competed in the 2008 non-gearbox Australian Superkart Championship. The series consisted of a single round, with four races.

Results and standings

Gearbox race calendar
The 2008 Australian Superkart Championship season consisted of two rounds. Four races were held at both race meetings.

NC - Non-championship point scoring round.

Non-gearbox race calendar

Drivers Championship 
Points were awarded 20-17-15-13-11-10-9-8-7-6-5-4-3-2-1 based on the top fifteen race positions in first three races of each round with one point for each other finisher. The fourth race of each round, which is longer than the others (eight laps vs five laps) awarded points for the top twenty race positions at 25-22-20-18-16-15-14-13-12-11-10-9-8-7-6-5-4-3-2-1 with one point for each other finisher.

References

External links
 Official championship website
 CAMS Manual reference to Australian titles

Superkart Championship
Australian Superkart Championship